Tapeinosperma is a genus of plants in the family Primulaceae (formerly Myrsinaceae). It occurs in Australia, New Guinea, Vanuatu, New Caledonia, Fiji. It is morphologically close to Discocalyx.

List of species (incomplete)
 Tapeinosperma campanula Mez
 Tapeinosperma pachycaulum

References

 
Primulaceae genera
Taxonomy articles created by Polbot
Taxa named by Joseph Dalton Hooker